Karen Elisabeth Jacobsen is an Australia-born and New York-based entertainer, singer, motivational speaker, voice-over artist and songwriter.

Early life and career
Born in Mackay, Queensland, Australia and writing songs from the age of seven, Jacobsen was inspired to be a professional singer by her idol Olivia Newton-John. She graduated from the Queensland Conservatorium Griffith University majoring in voice and piano, winning the Jazz Prize and completing her A.Mus.A. on piano.

Singing with the Queensland Youth Choir and being awarded the Warana Young Performer of the Year, she moved to Sydney making her musical theatre debut in the original Australian cast of Buddy – The Buddy Holly Story. She performed regularly on Australian television including Good Morning Australia and I Do I Do and her speaking and singing voices have been used on thousands of commercials for television, radio and online and in a billion+ devices.

On 4 July 2000, she relocated to New York City, writing and recording songs, and has since released ten albums on her independent label Kurly Queen.

Her songs have been on soundtracks for Dawson's Creek and the NBC show Passions and she has shared the stage with Christopher Cross, Neil Sedaka, Norah Jones, Cyndi Lauper, Spyro Gyra, Deborah Cox and Rachael Sage. She has written or recorded with Grammy Award winner Andy Zulla, Tony Award winner David Zippel, ARIA Award winner Sean O'Boyle, Emmy Award nominee Amy Powers and Grammy Award nominee Nicole Zuraitis.

International career
In 2002, Jacobsen's speaking voice was chosen as one of the Australian English options for the text-to-speech system used in GPS units for Garmin, Navman, TomTom and Mio and in telephone and computer software systems. Jacobsen has been dubbed by ABC News and CBS News as 'The Dashboard Diva' and by the Gold Coast Bulletin as 'Gadget Girl'.

She created the empowerment brand 'The GPS Girl' and in speaking engagements and performances shares the five directions for Recalculating, how to 'Recalculate' in Business and Life and 'The GPS Girl's Top Ten Directions for Life' and filmed the pilot of television show, 'Travel the World with The GPS Girl'.

From 2011 to 2014, Jacobsen's voice was used as the original female Australian voice of the Siri application on Apple iPhones, iPods and iPads.

Jacobsen was President of the New York Chapter of the National Speakers Association (2015) and performed on the main stage of the national conference singing The Star Spangled Banner and for the NSA Youth Convention in San Diego (2014). She served on the board of directors of the National Speakers Association, as Secretary (2017/2018/2019) 

She has appeared as Keynote Speaker  and Concert Performer at the Global Speakers Summit in Vancouver in 2013, the World Meetings Forum in Cancun (2014), the World Contact Forum in Mexico City (2014), the Australian Asphalt Pavement Association conference (2015) Gold Coast, Australian National Association of Teachers of Singing conference (2015) Tasmania and at TEDxTraverseCity. Karen was the closing keynote speaker at Project Management Institute's Symposium in Singapore, and on corporate day at the Global Speakers Summit in Auckland, NZ (2018) 

Karen has performed her one-woman show at the piano at Off-Broadway theaters Stage 72 at The Triad, The Laurie Beechman Theatre and Joe's Pub at The Public Theater, The Duplex and The Bitter End.

Jacobsen has published two books, Recalculate - Directions for Driving Performance Success (2015) and The GPS Girl's Road Map for Your Future (2011).

Her music and original songs have been recorded and released through Kurly Queen Records including By Request (1993), Strong Woman (1996), As I Am (2000), Being Brave (2002), Here In My Heart (2004), Kissing Someone Else (2007), Melting Moments, (Australia only 2009), Fun, Fun, Fun, Fun, Fun, Fun with Supa K with Supa K with Emmy Award-winning composer Michael Whalen (2011), Take a Little Drive (2013),  Destination Christmas (2015) Ready For What I Came Here For (2021) and the forthcoming album The Slipstream.

On Christmas Eve 2015, Jacobsen performed Hark the Herald Angels Sing on the live telecast of the Vision Australia Carols by Candlelight at the Sidney Myer Music Bowl in Melbourne, Australia. The 78th annual concert was attended by 12 000 people and viewed by over 2.7 million on the Nine Network across Australia, New Zealand and Asia.

Chosen to sing national anthems at major sporting events in both the United States and Australia, she performed Advance Australia Fair at the State of Origin Rugby League game in June, 2016 for a capacity crowd of 52,000 at Suncorp Stadium Lang Park in Queensland.

In November 2017, Jacobsen performed an arrangement of “America, the Beautiful” with the High Point University Chamber Singers at HPU's annual Veterans Day Celebration.

Jacobsen served as High Point University's Global Artist in Residence, working with and mentoring students.

In 2020 due to the pandemic, Jacobsen left her New York home of 20 yrs for Queensland, Australia, subsequently arriving in Airlie Beach in the Whitsundays, Queensland. As official Destination Ambassador she has been shining a light on the region through media appearances, advertising campaigns and her original music, videos and performances.

2020 saw the premiere of Karen's original musical memoir Mackay to Manhattan at the MECC in Mackay, Queensland.

In 2021 Karen gave the finale performance to a sold out audience at the Whitsundays Arts Festival.

To commemorate the 10th anniversary of former Australian Prime Minister Julia Gillard's iconic misogyny speech, Jacobsen set the speech to music word for word. The 'Misogyny Opus' is a one hour pop orchestral work, with the first section released in October 2022 with a music video including 70 equality advocates from around the world. As composer for the piece, Jacobsen recorded a full album and tour to spark conversation and empower a 'wave of equality.' The Misogyny Speech Opus by Karen Jacobsen (the Aussie Voice of Siri) and the Lane Cove Connection  "Now Karen Jacobsen, the original voice of the gps has written this classical music masterpiece." News Interview on National Australian TV Oct 8 2022 Misogyny Opus - Karen Jacobsen"One Australian artist has gone a step further, giving the speech a glow-up into a Disney musical worthy tune by Queensland recording artist, Karen Jacobsen"   

As co-Founder of the Whitsundays Songwriter Festival, the inaugural event took place in September 2022 with a professional songwriter residency including Graeme Connors Tia Gostelow Leanne Tennant (LT) Bryce Sainty and co-Founder Francesca de Valence at Yangaro in Funnel Bay near Airlie Beach in Queensland, Australia. Designed to create opportunities for regionally based Songwriters and to establish a world class songwriter presence in the area, the whitsongfest is part of the Whitsundays Arts Festival.

Charitable
Traveling to Lusaka, Zambia in 2006 to meet her sponsored child, Jacobsen raised awareness of the benefits of child sponsorship as an advocate for Children International. She started a group called To Zambia With Love to support the work of Children International and encouraged others to sponsor children.

In 2010, she was invited to become an Ambassador for Dress for Success speaking for a number of Professional Women's Groups in New York and at events in Brisbane, Australia.

In 2014 and 2015 she was the keynote speaker for EYO, an AAUW event for young women.

In 2015 she partnered with Careflight (now LifeFlight) Helicopters and Mackay CQ Rescue in Queensland, Australia speaking and singing at a series of events to raise awareness and funds for their lifesaving work.

In 2018 Karen narrated the Audio Book of the eLit International Award-winning book Broken to Brilliant - Breaking Free to be You After Domestic Violence, with anonymous stories from ten women. Funds raised from sales support programs for survivors mentoring survivors creating a new chapter in their lives. The official launch was in Brisbane in March, 2018, and Karen is the International Patron of Broken to Brilliant.

Awards
 Outstanding Alumnus of the Year, Queensland Conservatorium of Music Griffith University 2016
 President's Award for Distinguished Service, National Speakers Association 2016
 Dottie Burman Award, National Speakers Association NYC Chapter 2012
 Kauai Music Festival Song Contest, Runner Up 2004
 Abe Olman Scholarship, Songwriters Hall of Fame 2003
 U.K. Songwriting Contest, Pop Category Runner Up 2003
 Dallas Songwriting Contest, Singer Songwriter Category 1st Place 2002

Family
Jacobsen has a son who, she says, recognised her voice as that of Siri, saying "I wonder if he thinks everyone's mummy is in their iPhone.".

References

External links
 Are the robots waking up? ABC Radio National – 360documentaries
 GPS Girl on Facebook
 Great Big Story: Meet the Voice Behind Your GPS

Year of birth missing (living people)
Living people
Australian women singers
People from Mackay, Queensland